Jonathan Trumbull Sr. (October 12, 1710August 17, 1785) was an American politician and statesman who served as Governor of Connecticut during the American Revolution. Trumbull and Nicholas Cooke of Rhode Island were the only men to serve as governor of both a British colony and an American state, and he was the only governor to take up the Patriot cause at the start of the Revolutionary War. Trumbull College at Yale University, the town of Trumbull, Connecticut, Trumbull County, Ohio (originally part of the Connecticut Western Reserve), and Jonathan the Husky are all named for him.

Early life
Trumbull was born in Lebanon, Connecticut, the son of Joseph Trumble (1678–1755) and his wife, Hannah Trumble (née Higley), the daughter of John Higley and Hannah Drake. The patriarch of the Trumble family was the immigrant John Trumble (1612–1687), from Newcastle upon Tyne, Northumberland, who was Joseph's grandfather. The original spelling of "Trumble" was later changed for an unknown reason.

Jonathan graduated from Harvard College with a B.A. in 1727; for three years after graduation, he studied theology under the Reverend Solomon Williams at Lebanon and was licensed to preach at Colchester, Connecticut; this became a Master of Arts degree.

Career
Trumbull became a merchant with his father in 1731, participating more fully in the business after the death of his brother at sea in 1732. From 1733 to 1740, he was a delegate to the general assembly, and, in 1739–1740, was Speaker of the House. He was appointed lieutenant colonel in Connecticut's militia in 1739, and was colonel of the 12th Connecticut Regiment during the French and Indian War.

He served as deputy governor of the Colony of Connecticut from 1766 to 1769, and, on the death of Governor William Pitkin, became Governor of Connecticut in 1769, serving in that capacity until 1784, through Connecticut's transition from a colony to a U.S. state.

Revolutionary War
On May 13, 1774, British General Thomas Gage arrived in Boston, a city with a history of violent protests against British policies. Given the problems he was inheriting from Royal Governor Thomas Hutchinson, within a week of arriving Gage contacted Trumbull and expressed a "readiness to cooperate" with him "for the good of his Majesty's service." When Gage sent Trumbull a request for assistance after the Battles of Lexington and Concord in April 1775, Trumbull refused and made clear his choice to side with the Patriots. He replied that Gage's troops would "disgrace even barbarians", and he accused Gage of "a most unprovoked attack upon the lives and the property of his Majesty's subjects."

On July 6, 1775, along with other officers, Trumbull commissioned Nathan Hale as a first lieutenant in the newly raised Seventh Regiment of the Continental Army. Hale was later executed by the British for espionage.

Trumbull was a friend and advisor of General George Washington throughout the Revolutionary period, dedicating the resources of Connecticut to the fight for independence. Washington declared him "the first of the patriots." When Washington was desperate for men or food during the war, he could turn to "Brother Jonathan". Trumbull also served as the Continental Army's Paymaster General (Northern Department) in the spring of 1778, until the untimely death of his mother forced him to resign his post. As part of his resignation, he requested that the remainder of his back pay be distributed to the soldiers of the Northern Department.

Post-war
Trumbull was one of only two colonial governors to continue in office after independence (the other was Rhode Island's Nicholas Cooke, who assumed office early in the war). Governor Trumbull was elected as an honorary member of the Connecticut Society of the Cincinnati in 1784. In 1782, he was elected a Fellow of the American Academy of Arts and Sciences. He received an honorary LL.D. from Yale University in 1775 and from the University of Edinburgh in 1787.

Personal life

In 1736, one year prior to his marriage, Jonathan Trumbull Sr. purchased Flora, a 'mulato girl and slave for life', from Eliphalet Adams of New London.

On December 9, 1735, he married Faith Robinson (1718–1780), daughter of Reverend John Robinson. They were the parents of six children, including:
Joseph Trumbull (1737–1778), first commissary general of the Continental Army and an early member of the Board of War.
Jonathan Trumbull Jr. (1740–1809), aide-de-camp to General George Washington from 1781 to the end of the war, and Governor of Connecticut from 1798 to 1809.
Faith Trumbull (1743–1775), who married General Jedidiah Huntington.
Mary Trumbull (1745–1831), who married William Williams, signer of the Declaration of Independence.
David Trumbull (1751–1822), commissary of the Colony of Connecticut and father of Joseph Trumbull, the 35th Governor of Connecticut.
John Trumbull (1756–1843), "Painter of the American Revolution" and aide-de-camp to General Washington for 19 days in 1775.

Trumbull died in Lebanon, Connecticut, and is buried at the Old Cemetery there. His home in Lebanon, the Jonathan Trumbull House, was declared a National Historic Landmark in 1965.

In historical fiction
In A Little Maid of Old Connecticut by Alice Turner Curtis, the main character, a little girl named Ellie Barlow, aided by a friend, delivers a secret message to Trumbull during his years as governor, after which he seeks her out, and helps her friend's father get a much-needed job. The story begins in the year 1777.

See also

 Maria Trumbull, granddaughter

Notes

Bibliography
Baker, Mark Allen (2014). Spies of Revolutionary Connecticut, From Benedict Arnold to Nathan Hale. The History Press. 
Baker, Mark Allen (2014). Connecticut Families of the Revolution, American Forebears from Burr to Wolcott. The History Press.
Phelps, M. William (2008). Nathan Hale: The Life and Death of America's First Spy, St. Martin's Press.
Lefkowitz, Arthur S.(2003). George Washington's Indispensable Men: The 32 Aides-de-Camp Who Helped Win the Revolution, Stackpole Books.
Rose, Alexander (2006). Washington's Spies: The Story of America's First Spy Ring, Bantam Books.

External links
Biography, genealogy, chronology and bibliography
Governor Jonathan Trumbull House and Wadsworth Stable
Connecticut State Library
The USGenWeb Project, Fairfield County

People of Connecticut in the French and Indian War
People of Connecticut in the American Revolution
1710 births
1785 deaths
Governors of Connecticut
Colonial governors of Connecticut
Harvard University alumni
People of colonial Connecticut
American slave owners
Fellows of the American Academy of Arts and Sciences
Political leaders of the American Revolution
American people of English descent
Trumbull, Connecticut
People from Lebanon, Connecticut